Dudnik or Dudnyk is a gender-neutral Slavic surname. It may refer to:
Andrei Dudnik (born 1981), Russian football player
Ihor Dudnyk (born 1985), Ukrainian football defender
Olesya Dudnik (born 1974), Ukrainian gymnastics coach and former artistic gymnast
Yelena Dudnik (born 1978), Russian sport shooter
Yuriy Dudnyk (born 1968), Ukrainian football coach and a former player
Yuriy Dudnyk (footballer, born 2002), Ukrainian football player